Rožič Vrh (in older sources Rožičev verh) is a settlement in the hills west of the town of Črnomelj in the White Carniola area of southeastern Slovenia. The area is part of the traditional region of Lower Carniola and is now included in the Southeast Slovenia Statistical Region. It includes the territory of the abandoned village of Gradec (also known as Zagradec) and Topli Vrh.

Mass graves
Rožič Vrh is the site of two known mass graves associated with the Second World War. The Zagradec Mass Grave is located in a sinkhole below a forest trail and hay meadow southeast of Gradec. The grave contains the remains of 61 Roma from Kanižarica that were murdered on 21 July 1942.

References

External links
Rožič Vrh on Geopedia

Populated places in the Municipality of Črnomelj